José Enrique Reina Lizárraga (born 12 August 1969) is a Mexican politician affiliated with the PAN. He served as Deputy of the LXII Legislature of the Mexican Congress representing Sonora, as well as a local deputy in the LIX Legislature of the Congress of Sonora. He was the mayor of San Luis Río Colorado from 2000 to 2003 and 2015 to 2018.

References

1969 births
Living people
Politicians from Sonora
National Action Party (Mexico) politicians
21st-century Mexican politicians
Autonomous University of Baja California alumni
People from Pitiquito Municipality
Members of the Congress of Sonora
Municipal presidents in Sonora
Deputies of the LXII Legislature of Mexico
Members of the Chamber of Deputies (Mexico) for Sonora